Net metering in Michigan was a state program that allowed utility customers to develop renewable energy generation projects on-site at their home or business to meet their own energy needs and reduce their electric bill. As of the end of 2015, Michigan had approximately 2,000 net metering customers. The net metering program was replaced with a inflow/outflow program which charges retail rate for grid energy used and pays for excess sent to the grid at a cost-avoided rate. This cost-avoided rate is much lower than the retail rate and each utility must have their price approved by the state utility board in their rate case.

Background 

In Michigan, net metering is a public policy issue surrounding the distribution of excess energy— produced by businesses, organizations or homes using solar panels or other renewable sources of energy—through the utility distribution system. Under the system, for example, when a home that uses solar panels creates more energy than it uses, the extra energy is sent to the electric grid. The homeowner is then reimbursed or credited with providing that energy to the grid.

State law mandated that these home or business renewable energy projects should be sized to provide only what is necessary to meet the home or business owner's own energy needs.

The public policy surrounding net metering is a political issue between solar customers and solar energy installers vs. utility companies. In over 40 states, utilities are forced to buy the excess energy generated by home- or business-based solar panels (or other renewable energy sources located on-site) at rates set by state regulators. The issue centers around the rate at which the utility must buy back excess energy. Under net metering arrangements, utilities buy back power at the retail rate, which is the rate charged to customers, rather than at lower rate such as a avoided cost rate or at a wholesale rate, which is the rate the utilities pay power generators for electricity. The retail rate is what customers pay for energy used.

History 

In 2009, Michigan's net metering program began with the enactment of Public Act 295 of 2008, which was signed into law on October 6, 2008 by Governor Jennifer Granholm. According to the state of Michigan, "The Act promotes the development of clean and renewable energy and energy optimization through the implementation of standards that will cost-effectively provide greater energy security and diversify the energy resources used to meet consumers' needs, encourage private investment in renewable energy and energy efficiency and improve air quality."

The law also mandated that 10 percent of the state's electric power be generated from renewable sources by the year 2015. Net metering customers would procure credit for excess energy returned to the grid at retail rates. "Programs are capped at 1 percent of a regulated utility's peak demand, which is further broken down into categories for small and larger-scale installations," according to Midwest Energy News.

In 2015, net metering in Michigan increased by 20 percent. Net metering installations rose 3 megawatts to approximately 17 megawatts of generation. According to the Michigan Public Service Commission (MPSC), net metering increased from 1,840 customers and 1,947 installations in 2014 to 2,155 customers and 2,289 in 2015. Michigan Energy Innovation Business Council President Liesl Eichler Clark stated, "Yet again, we are seeing that Michigan ratepayers are turning to solar power and on-site renewables. As more and more homeowners and businesses make the switch, the solar contagion effect becomes increasingly apparent."

2016 bill 

In December 2016, both houses of the Michigan legislature passed a bill which increased the Renewable Portfolio Standard (RPS) from 10 percent to 15 percent and implemented a deadline to impose a "grid" fee for future distributed-generation (DG) customers. Governor Rick Snyder supported signing the bill.

Utilities in Michigan will have to generate 15 percent of their electricity from renewable sources by January 1, 2022. Solar advocates opposed the "grid charge," which the utilities deem necessary in order for DG solar customers pay their fair share of grid upkeep.

Current DG solar customers and new customers who join a program before the instatement are exempt from the grid-charge for 10 years. Only customers who join a net metering program after the grid-charge is enacted will have to pay the fee.

Recent developments in 2017 

On January 26, 2017, Michigan Governor Rick Snyder discussed balancing the implementation of new renewables and natural gas to the state's energy plans. He also stressed concerns regarding an over-reliance on natural gas and the importance of "increasing viability" in terms of solar power.

See also
 Net metering in Arizona
 Net metering in Nevada

References

Energy in Michigan